Defensoría del Pueblo (Spanish, 'public defender' or 'ombudsman') may refer to:

 Defensoría del Pueblo (Bolivia), a national government agency for that oversees and promotes human rights 
 Ombudsman's Office of Colombia, a national government agency for overseeing the protection of civil and human rights
 Defensoría del Pueblo (Venezuela), a state-funded agency for investigating complaints against a public authority

See also

Ombudsman